Frank Leighton (1908–1962) was an Australian actor best known for two leading roles in films for Ken G. Hall, Thoroughbred (1936) and Tall Timbers (1937).

Biography
Leighton was born in Sydney and studied at St John's School, Darlinghurst, before winning a scholarship to Cleveland Boys High School. He was working for his father when he heard the theatrical firm J.C. Williamson Ltd were conducting voice trials at Her Majesty's Theatre. He auditioned and three months later was employed by the company in a production of The Lady of the Rose. He worked for Williamsons over the next 13 years, acting in dramas, comedies and musicals, including productions of Blue Roses, Hold My Hand, Our Miss Gibbs, The Quaker Girl, The Merry Widow and The Maid of the Mountains opposite Gladys Moncrieff. He understudied for visiting star William Feversham in a production of The Prince and the Pauper.

Leighton also acted in movies, starting with Two Minutes Silence (1933). His most notable credits were leading roles  in Thoroughbred (1936) and Tall Timbers (1937) for Cinesound Productions. His co-star in Thoroughbred was Helen Twelvetrees with whom Ken G. Hall claims Leighton had an affair during filming.

Later career
Leighton moved to London in 1937, where he mostly worked in theatre.

He declared bankruptcy in 1950.

Filmography

TV
Reunion Day (1962)

Theatre
The Lady of the Rose
Blue Roses
Hold My Hand
Our Miss Gibbs
Mr Cinders
The Quaker Girl
The Merry Widow
Till, Darling
The Prince and the Pauper
My Lady's Dress
Blue Mountain Melody (1934)
The Fleet's Lit Up (1939)
Dish Ran Away (1950) – Whitehall

References

External links 
 
Frank Leighton Australian theatre credits at AusStage
Frank Leighton at National Film and Sound Archive

1908 births
1962 deaths
Australian male film actors
Australian male stage actors
Australian emigrants to England
Male actors from Sydney
20th-century Australian male actors